Chittajallu Krishnaveni (born 24 December 1924), often known as C. Krishnaveni or simply Krishnaveni, is an Indian Telugu language actress, producer and playback singer.

Life and career
Krishnaveni hails from Pangidi, West Godavari dist. AP, India. She was a drama artist before entering the film industry.  Her debut was in the film Anasuya (1936) as a child artist. Her father Krishna Rao was a doctor. She moved to Chennai in 1939 as she began to get several offers to act in Telugu films. She also acted in other language films, such as Tamil.

She married Mirzapuram zamindar in 1939. She became active with producing and filmmaking at her husband's Sobhanachala Studios in Chennai. 

She is remembered for introducing several stalwart film personalities in her Telugu film Mana Desam (1949) as a producer. They included N T Rama Rao as actor, Ghantasala Venkateswara Rao as music director, P Leela as playback singer among others. Mana Desam was based on the Bengali novel Vipradas.

Selected filmography

Producer

Production companies managed by Krishnaveni
 Her husband's company – Jaya pictures and later renamed as Sobhanachala Studios.
 Her own company – MRA productions on their daughter's name Meka RajyaLaksmi Anuradha.

Movies produced by Krishnaveni
 Mana Desam (1949)
 Lakshmamma
 Dampatyam,
 Bhakta Prahlada

Note: The lists are not comprehensive.

Singer
 Keelu Gurram (1949)
 Bala Mitrula Katha (1972)

References

External links

1924 births
Living people
20th-century Indian businesswomen
20th-century Indian businesspeople
20th-century Indian actresses
20th-century Indian women singers
20th-century Indian singers
Actresses from Andhra Pradesh
Actresses from Rajahmundry
Actresses in Telugu cinema
Businesswomen from Andhra Pradesh
Child actresses in Telugu cinema
Film musicians from Andhra Pradesh
Film producers from Andhra Pradesh
Indian business executives
Indian women playback singers
Indian film actresses
Indian women business executives
Indian women film producers
Singers from Andhra Pradesh
Telugu film producers
Telugu playback singers